"Flex (Ooh, Ooh, Ooh)" is a song by American rapper Rich Homie Quan. It was released on February 10, 2015, as a single from his fifth mixtape If You Ever Think I Will Stop Goin' in Ask RR (Royal Rich) & Summer Sampler (2015). It was produced by DJ Spinz and Nitti Beatz.

Commercial performance
The song has peaked at number 26 on the US Billboard Hot 100. To date, this is Rich Homie Quan's highest-charting single as a solo artist. As of August 2015, "Flex (Ooh, Ooh, Ooh)" has sold 425,000 copies domestically.

Music video
A music video for "Flex (Ooh, Ooh, Ooh)" was released on April 1, 2015. It was directed by Be El Be. The video is notable for its high levels of stunting and also serves as the preeminent example of "hitting the Quan."

Charts

Weekly charts

Year-end charts

Certifications

Awards and nominations

References

External links
 
 

2015 singles
2014 songs
Rich Homie Quan songs
Songs written by DJ Spinz
Songs written by Nitti (producer)